The Polson Feed Mill is a site on the National Register of Historic Places located in Polson, Montana.  It was added to the Register on April 29, 1980. The Polson Feed Mill was built about 1910. The mill is significant because of its historic associations with the development of Polson and Lake County.

References

Industrial buildings and structures on the National Register of Historic Places in Montana
Buildings and structures completed in 1910
National Register of Historic Places in Lake County, Montana
Grinding mills on the National Register of Historic Places